The fourth season of X Factor premiered on Sky 1 on August 27, 2018 and consists of a new judging line-up comprising former Modern Talking lead vocalist Thomas Anders, American singer Iggy Uriarte, singer Jennifer Weist and rapper Sido. It was presented by Charlotte Würdig and Bence Istenes, who replaced former host Jochen Schropp.

Production
The show was originally cancelled in 2012 after the third series but an announcement was made for a revival series to be aired in 2018 on a new channel with an all-new judging line up and presenter.  According to reports, the revival's premiere achieved only 30,000 viewers. Throughout the season, the show's viewership has been between 10,000 to 70,000 viewers. The finale only had 40,000 viewers.

The revival was shortly canceled after the final show.

Finalists

Key:
 – Winner
 – Runner-up
 – Third place

Elimination Chart

Colour key

Live show details

Week 1 (5 October)
This week the 4 acts with most votes from the public were saved while the judges chose which 4 acts to save.

Week 2 (12 October) 
The 3 acts who placed 1st, 2nd and 3rd in the public voting progressed to the final while the 2 acts who placed 4th and 5th in the public voting battled it out in the sing-off for the last place in the final while the remaining 3 acts who placed 6th, 7th and 8th in the public voting were eliminated.

Week 3 Final (19 October)

References

2018 German television seasons
Germany 04